George Mayer may refer to:
George Mayer (gymnast), bronze medalist in Gymnastics at the 1904 Summer Olympics
Jorge Mayer (1915–2010), Roman Catholic Archbishop Emeritus of the Archdiocese of Bahía Blanca, Argentina
George A. Mayer (1917–2000), Wisconsin State Senator
George E. Mayer (born 1952), United States Naval officer and aviator
Christopher Mayer (American actor) (George Charles Mayer III, 1954–2011), American actor

See also
Georg (George) Mayer-Marton (1897–1960), Hungarian-Austrian Jewish artist
George Meyer (disambiguation)
Mayer (disambiguation)